Epitola is a genus of butterflies in the family Lycaenidae. The species of this genus are  endemic to the Afrotropical realm. Epitola was erected by John O. Westwood in 1851.

Species
Epitola posthumus (Fabricius, 1793)
Epitola urania Kirby, 1887
Epitola uranoides Libert, 1999
Epitola concepcion Suffert, 1904

Species of unknown status
Epitola lamborni Bethune-Baker, 1922 (nomen dubium)
Epitola pulverulentula Dufrane, 1953 (spelled as Epitola pulverulenta in Ackery, et al., 1995) (nomen dubium)
Epitola ernesti  Karsch, 1895 (nomen dubium)

References

External links

Royal Museum of Central Africa Images
Die Gross-Schmetterlinge der Erde 13: Die Afrikanischen Tagfalter. Plate XIII 65 a ernesti, concepcion

Poritiinae
Lycaenidae genera
Taxa named by John O. Westwood